Suncheon (Suncheon-si) is a city in South Jeolla Province, South Korea. It is a scenic agricultural and industrial city of around 280,000 people near Suncheon Bay. It is located in the southeastern corner of Jeollanam-do, just over an hour south-east of Gwangju. Forty minutes south of Suncheon is the port city of Yeosu, and twenty minutes to the east of Suncheon is Gwangyang. 
It is currently experiencing strong development due to being included as part of the Gwangyang Bay Free Economic Zone, one of three newly created Free Economic Zones (FEZs) in South Korea due to open within the next decade. As of October 14, 2007 plans are being set up and a referendum is being planned for a merging of the cities of Yeosu, Suncheon and Gwangyang into a new metropolitan city, taking advantage of the Gwangyang Bay Free Economic Zone, Yeosu's Expo 2012 bid and port facilities, Suncheon's educational institutes and Gwangyang's POSCO plant.

History

Era of Samhan: Territory of Mahan
Era of the three kingdoms: a territory of Baekje, named Gampyeong-gun
Era of the unified Silla: named Seungpyeong-gun in 757, the 16th year of King Gyeongdeok's reign
Era of Koryeo: renamed Seungju in 940, Taejo's 23rd year on the throne.
Era of Koryeo: called Seungpyeong-gun in 1036, Seongjong's second year as king.
Era of Koryeo: raised to the status of Seungju-mok in 1309, the year Chungseon becomes king.
Taejong established the Suncheon Dohobu in the 13th year of reign, 1413.
Changed to Suncheon-gun in 1895, under Gojong's reign.
November 1, 1931: Suncheon-gun Suncheon-myeon becomes Suncheon-eup.
August 15, 1949: 9 ri's of Dosa-myeon and part of Haeryong-myeon (Wangji, Jorye, and Yeonhyang) are annexed by Suncheon on August 13, 1949. The area is elevated to the City of Sunche on the 15th.  Other surrounding areas are put into the district of Seungju-gun.
January 1, 1995: reborn as 'Suncheon City' after annexing Seungju-gun.

Yeosu–Suncheon Rebellion

In October 1948, a rebellion swept Yeosu, Suncheon, and nearby towns, when South Korean soldiers refused to take part in the suppression of the ongoing Jeju uprising. The rebel forces killed a number of ROK soldiers, police, officials, and landlords. A couple days later, the rebellion was crushed by the South Korean military. Civilians thought to have aided the rebellion were also summarily executed.

Tourism

2013 Suncheon Garden Exposition 

2013 Suncheon Garden Expo Korea: The 2013 Suncheon Garden Expo Korea was the first of its kind to be held in Korea. The Expo focused on green industry development such as solar energy, sustainable garden development and electronic transportation. It showcased green technologies, international garden exhibits, and wetland conservation. The Expo grounds, its permanent gardens, arboretum, wetland center, and connecting monorail to Suncheon Bay are maintained for continued tourism.

Temples 

Songgwang Temple: It is one of the Three Jewel Temples of Korea and a popular place for Jinul. The temple is located in Sinpyeong-ri, Songgwang-myeon. It is one of the Sambosachal along with Haein temple of Habcheon and Tongdo Temple of Yangsan. Jinul strived here to renew the tradition of Buddhism 800 years ago. The temple bore 16 state monks in the past. Today, the temple is home for monks from overseas and is a place to study the Buddhist culture of Korea. The temple was first built at the end of Silla Kingdom and named Gilsang Temple. It was then renamed in the Goryeo dynasty under the reign of Myeongjong, to Songgwang Temple. Reconstructions were done after it was burnt down in the Joseon dynasty, but was severely damaged again in 1948 and 1951. At present, 33 complexes have been restored after 8 reconstruction projects from 1984 to 1988. The temple has a total of 26 cultural assets, including 17 national cultural assets and 9 local ones.
Seonamsa: Seonamsa of Mount Jogye is located in Jukak-ri, Seungju-eup, Suncheon. In the Baekje Kingdom, Adohwasang had first built a small temple in the mountain and named it Biroam of Cheongnyangsan Mountain. The temple was named Seonamsa later in the Silla Kingdom by state monk Doseon. Seonamsa is known to be a mixture of the various sects of Buddhism of the Goryeo dynasty. Cheontaejong was established here 900 years ago by Ui Cheon and the monk's heirs have been carried down to the present age. Seonamsa, like Songgwangsa, is a library for studies of Korean Buddhist culture. A total of 18 cultural assets are found here, including 7 treasures and 11 local cultural assets.
Cheonjaam, Ssanghyangsu: Belongs to the Chinese juniper family, and is technically named Juniperus Chinensi Limme. The height is 12.5 m and the circumference is 3.98m. The tree is about 700 years old. According to the legend, the cane used by a Buddhist on his way back from China had grown into the tree. The tree is uniquely twisted form. 
Natural monument No, 88 (designated on Dec. 3, 1962). 
Ieub-ri, Songgwang-myeon (Songgwang Temple). 
Area 600 pyeong (1.98 km2).

Castles 
Nagan Castle, the only remaining Joseon castle in South Jeolla Province. It is well preserved and has many festivals like the Namdo food festival.
Suncheon Japanese Castle, a Japanese castle built during the Japanese invasions of Korea.

Mountains 
Jogyesan: The mountain where Songgwang Temple and Seonamsa are located.
Geumjeonsan: Surrounding north of Nagan Castle. 
Bonghwasan: The nearest mountain from the center of the city. There's Jukdobong Park having a lookout pavilion.

Parks 
Suncheon Bay Ecological Park: The world's fifth biggest tideland, featuring reed beds and there many types of birds. The reverve was designated as a preservation zone by the Ministry of Oceans and Fisheries in 2003. 
Goindol Park, a dolmen park in Hwasun, Suncheon: Gochang, Hwasun and Ganghwa Dolmen Sites were designated as a World Heritage Site by UNESCO in 2000.
Suncheon Open Film Location: Drama film set located in the neighborhood of Jorye-dong. This set was created to film movies and dramas in 2006. The village is split in three eras: 1950's Suncheon, 1960's Seoul Bongcheong-dong Village and 1970's Seoul suburb. 
Naganeupseong Folk Village: a historic village representing the traditional lifestyle and cultural landscape in the Joseon Dynasty. It was originally and administrative town and has preserved traditional elements such as a fortress, government buildings and private houses.

Museums 

 The Deep-Rooted Tree Museum (순천시립 뿌리깊은나무 박물관) is located close to Naganeupseong Walled Town. A collection of Korean famous magazine’s founder, Han Chang-gi; as well as artifacts from the Bronze Age to the present era are displayed. The museum also features 6,500 articles including Korean vintage literature books, folk arts, ceramics, and traditional items of clothing from the Three Kingdoms era, in which visitors could sense the ancient-modern Korean culture and lifestyles.

Filming Locations 

 Jorye-dong, which is located in Suncheon is the largest filming site in Korea that preserves the 60s and 80s buildings. Visitors could experience vintage village life in the 1960s and 1980s, as there are 200 houses with 39,669.6 m². A remake drama written by Kim Soo-Hyeon <Love & Ambition> starring actor Lee Byung-hun and actress Soo-ae was filmed in Jorye-dong, Suncheon. Other hit movies and dramas such as <You are far Away> (2008) and <Giant> (2010) were also shot in the same city. 
 In 2021, the Korea Tourism Organization released a music video in collaboration with Korea’s famous hip-hop label AOMG and Higher Music to produce a soundtrack to highlight the attractions and cultural heritage in Korea. The clips of the music video were filmed in Suncheon, which demonstrates the coexistence of tradition and contemporary lifestyles In Korea.

Slogans
On its website, Suncheon is dubbed by its city council as the City of Beautiful People, and its slogan is "Aha! Suncheon."

Climate

Twin towns – sister cities

Suncheon is twinned with:

 Antalya, Turkey
 Columbia, United States
 Izumi, Japan
 Kragujevac, Serbia
 Nantes, France
 Taiyuan, China

Notable people from Suncheon
 Kai (Real Name: Kim Jong-in, Hangul: 김종인), singer, rapper, dancer, actor, model and K-pop idol, member of K-pop boygroup Exo, the sub unit Exo-K and the K-pop Superboygroup SuperM.
 Lee Seul-bi (Hangul: 이슬비), South Korean actress
 Minhee (Real Name: Kang Min-hee, Hangul: 강민희), singer, dancer and K-pop idol, member of K-pop boygroup Cravity.
 Kim Ok-vin, South Korean actress
 Jun (Real Name: Park Jun-hee, Hangul: 박준희), singer, dancer and K-pop idol, leader and member of K-pop boygroup A.C.E.
 Hae Yoon (Real Name: Park Hae-yoon, Hangul: 박해윤), singer, dancer and K-pop idol, leader and member of K-pop girlgroup Cherry Bullet.
 Hyunseung (Real Name: Jang Hyun-seung, Hangul: 장현승), singer, dancer and K-pop idol, former member of K-pop boygroup Beast.
 Gongchan (Real Name: Gong Chan-sik, Hangul: 공찬식), singer, dancer, model, actor, MC and K-pop idol, member of K-pop boygroup B1A4
 Chaeyeon (Real Name: Jung Chae-yeon, Hangul: 정채연), singer, dancer, model, actress and K-pop idol, member of K-pop girlgroup DIA and former member of K-pop girlgroup I.O.I
 Yoon Shi-yoon (Real Name: Yoon Dong-gu, Hangul: 윤동구), South Korean actor
 Miryo (Real Name: Jo Mi-hye, Hangul: 조미혜), singer-songwriter, rapper, dancer, record producer and K-pop idol, member of K-pop girlgroup Brown Eyed Girls
Eyedi (Real name: Nam Yujin, Hangul: 남유진), singer, songwriter, and actress under Bace Camp Studios, former contestant on Mixnine.
Kang Heodallim(Real name: Kang Kyeong-sun, Hangul: 강경순), blues singer-songwriter
Park Gyeul(Hangul: 박결), South Korea Golf Player
Park Cho-seon(Hangul: 박초선), a female Pansori Korean classical musician and eponymous poet during the Japanese colonial period.

See also
 List of cities in South Korea
 Geography of South Korea
 Suncheon Hyocheon High School

References

External links 

 Suncheon city government home page (in Korean)

 

 
Cities in South Jeolla Province
Biosphere reserves of South Korea